Thaniniram is a 1973 Indian Malayalam-language film, directed by J. Sasikumar and produced by Muhammad Assam. The film stars Prem Nazir, Vijayasree, Thikkurissy Sukumaran Nair, Jose Prakash and Sankaradi. The film had musical score by G. Devarajan.

Cast
Prem Nazir as Prabhakaran
Thikkurissy Sukumaran Nair as Gopalan Master
Vijayasree as Radha
Jose Prakash as Mathai/Mathew Philip
Sankaradi as Vaidyan
K. P. Ummer as Tank Madhavan
Sadhana as Menaka
Usharani as Vasanthy
 Meena as Insane lady
Paravoor Bharathan as Kozhi Krishnan/Aathmanantha Guru Swami
N. Govindankutty as Aadu Veladuyhan
T. S. Muthaiah as P. K. Warrier
Kaviyoor Ponnamma as Subhadra
Adoor Bhasi as Vishvambharan
Pattom Sadan as Sukumarankutty

Soundtrack
The music was composed by G. Devarajan and the lyrics were written by Vayalar Ramavarma and P. Bhaskaran.

References

External links
 

1973 films
1970s Malayalam-language films
Films directed by J. Sasikumar